The CERH Cup Winners' Cup was a European club roller hockey competition organised annually by the Comité Européen de Rink-Hockey for domestic cup winners in each country. Created in 1976, it was merged with the European Cup in 1996 to form the CERH Champions League, which was renamed the CERH European League in 2005. HC Liceo were the competition's last winners.

The most successful teams in the competition were Sporting CP (from Portugal), AD Oeiras (also from Portugal) and Roller Monza (from Italy), with three wins apiece.

Finals

Performances

By team

By country

External links 
 CERH Media Guide – 2013–14

Recurring sporting events established in 1976
Roller hockey competitions
Recurring events disestablished in 1996